Akhila Sasidharan is a former Indian actress who worked mainly in the Malayalam film industry. She made her debut with the 2010 film Kaaryasthan.

Biography

Trained as Bharatanatyam dancer, she successfully grabbed the Vodafone Thakadhimi runner up title, a dance reality show that was screened on popular Malayalam channel Asianet in 2007. Followed by the success of this reality show, she started anchoring a  music reality show on Asianet called Munch Star Singer Junior. She is also learning Kalaripayattu. She is a post-graduate in English literature.

Her debut as an actress was in the movie Kaaryasthan (2010), which starred Dileep which then became one of the highest-grossing films of the year. She played the lead character Sreebala, in the movie which was directed by Thomson. K. Thomas. Her second movie was, Teja Bhai & Family, which has Prithviraj in the lead.

Filmography

References

External links

 
Akhila Sasidharan at Metromatinee.com
 Akhila Sasidharan at Imoviehall

Living people
Indian film actresses
Actresses from Kozhikode
Actresses in Malayalam cinema
Bharatiya Vidya Bhavan schools alumni
21st-century Indian actresses
1992 births